Jacopo or Giacomo da Carrara may refer to:
Jacopino da Carrara
Jacopo I da Carrara, (died 1324), called the Great, founder Carraresi dynasty that ruled Padua from 1318 to 1405
Jacopo II da Carrara, (died 1350), of the Carraresi family, was the capitano del popolo of Padua from 1345 until his death

See also
Carraresi family